Rameshwar Das Birla (also Rameshwardas Birla) (1892–1973) was an Indian entrepreneur. He was second son of Baldeo Das Birla and the father of Madhav Prasad Birla and Gajanan Birla. He is known for founding hospitals & educational institutions in Mumbai, Kolkata and Pilani.

Birla's decision in 1922 to remarry following the death of his first wife caused a split in the Maheshwari caste of which his family were a member. They were outcast by the community, who doubted that his new wife was herself a Maheshwari and thus believed that Birla had broken the caste rules relating to marriage.

See also
Birla family

Sources

Bio on the web URL accessed on 1 April 2006

Rameshwar Das
Rajasthani people
1892 births
1973 deaths
Indian businesspeople in textiles
Founders of Indian schools and colleges
20th-century Indian philanthropists